New Orleans Blues may refer to:
New Orleans blues, a subgenre of blues music
"New Orleans Blues", the 1925 composition by Jelly Roll Morton (see Spanish Tinge)
New Orleans rhythm and blues, a genre of music from New Orleans, Louisiana
Louisiana Blues, an American basketball team
"Louisiana Blues," a song by Bonnie Raitt and Little Feat